Blythewood is a historic mansion in Amite City, Louisiana, U.S..

History
The land was granted by New Spain to Reliegh Self. A cotton plantation with a mansion was built prior to the American Civil War of 1861–1865. However, the mansion was subsequently burned down.

A new mansion was built for Daniel Hardy Sanders from 1885 to 1888. It was designed in the Colonial Revival architectural style by Drake & Anderson. It has been listed on the National Register of Historic Places since June 25, 1982. It serves as a bed & breakfast.

References

Houses on the National Register of Historic Places in Louisiana
Colonial Revival architecture in Louisiana
19th-century establishments in Louisiana
National Register of Historic Places in Tangipahoa Parish, Louisiana
Plantations in Louisiana